Parthenocissus henryana (Chinese Virginia-creeper or silver vein creeper) is a species of flowering plant in the vine family Vitaceae, native to China.

Description
It has a more restrained growth than the other Virginia creepers. The leaves colour to a brilliant red in autumn before falling. Clusters of inconspicuous flowers in summer may be followed by black fruits.

Cultivation
It was named for the Irish plant collector Augustine Henry (1857–1930) who discovered the species on his tour of Central China in the 1880s. It was introduced to Great Britain by another great plant collector, Ernest Henry Wilson, in 1903.

Parthenocissus henryana can grow on walls and trellising, in large pots, and as a groundcover on slopes.  It is propagated from seeds or cuttings. It has gained the Royal Horticultural Society's Award of Garden Merit.

References

henryana
Vines
Flora of China
Garden plants of Asia